The Fiat Abarth 850 TC is a special high-performance racing-oriented version of the Fiat 600, designed and developed by Italian manufacturer and tuner Abarth, originally built to Group 2 touring car specifications, and manufactured between 1961 and 1969.

References

Abarth vehicles
Fiat vehicles
Cars introduced in 1961
Sports cars
Cars of Italy